Southward is an adjective meaning "movement towards the south".

People with the name Southward include:
Ferguson Southward (1898 – 1981), English rugby league footballer of the 1920s
Ike Southward (1934 – 2006), English rugby league footballer of the 1950s and 1960s
John Southward (1840 – 1902), English writer
Len Southward (1905 – 2004), New Zealand engineer, businessman, and vehicle collector
Walter Southward (1902 – 1977), English Archdeacon in New Zealand

See also
Southward Car Museum
MS Southward, a cruise ship

Southbound (disambiguation)
Southern (surname)